Year 516 (DXVI) was a leap year starting on Friday (link will display the full calendar) of the Julian calendar. At the time, it was known as the Year of the Consulship of Petrus without colleague (or, less frequently, year 1269 Ab urbe condita). The denomination 516 for this year has been used since the early medieval period, when the Anno Domini calendar era became the prevalent method in Europe for naming years.

Events 
 By place 
 Europe 
 Hygelac, king of the Geats (Sweden), raids the Lower Rhine and is defeated by a Frankish force led by Theudebert (according to the "History of the Franks"). 
 King Gundobad of the Burgundians dies peacefully after a 43-year reign, and is succeeded by his eldest son Sigismund.

 By topic 
 Religion 
 November 6 – The Council of Tarragona (modern Spain) is held.

Births 
 Athalaric, king of the Ostrogoths (d. 534)
 Ciarán of Clonmacnoise, Irish bishop (d. 546)

Deaths 
 Gundobad, king of the Burgundians
 Hygelac, king of the Geats (approximate date)
 John, Coptic Orthodox patriarch of Alexandria
 Oisc, king of Kent (approximate date)

References